Arkansas was admitted to the Union on June 15, 1836, and elects its senators to Class 2 and Class 3. Arkansas's Senate seats were declared vacant in July 1861, due to its secession from the Union. They were again filled from June 1868. Its current senators are Republicans John Boozman and Tom Cotton. John L. McClellan was Arkansas's longest-serving senator (1943–1977).

List of senators

|- style="height:2em"
! rowspan=5 | 1
| rowspan=5 align=left | William S. Fulton
|  | Jacksonian
| rowspan=5 nowrap | Sep 18, 1836 –Aug 15, 1844
| rowspan=3 | Elected in 1836.
| rowspan=3 | 1
| 
| 1
| Elected in 1836.
| rowspan=9 nowrap | Sep 18, 1836 –Mar 15, 1848
|  | Jacksonian
| rowspan=9 align=right | Ambrose Hundley Sevier
! rowspan=9 | 1

|- style="height:2em"
| rowspan=4  | Democratic
| 
| rowspan=3 | 2
| rowspan=3 | Re-elected in 1837.
| rowspan=8  | Democratic

|- style="height:2em"
| 

|- style="height:2em"
| rowspan=2 | Re-elected in 1840.Died.
| rowspan=5 | 2
| 

|- style="height:2em"
| rowspan=3 
| rowspan=9 | 3
| rowspan=5 | Re-elected in 1843.Resigned.

|- style="height:2em"
| colspan=3 | Vacant
| nowrap | Aug 15, 1844 –Nov 8, 1844
|  

|- style="height:2em"
! rowspan=5 | 2
| rowspan=5 align=left | Chester Ashley
| rowspan=5  | Democratic
| rowspan=5 nowrap | Nov 8, 1844 –Apr 29, 1848
| rowspan=2 | Elected to finish Fulton's term.

|- style="height:2em"
| 

|- style="height:2em"
| rowspan=3 | Elected to a full term in 1846.Died.
| rowspan=7 | 3
| rowspan=5 

|- style="height:2em"
|  
| nowrap | Mar 15, 1848 –Mar 30, 1848
| colspan=3 | Vacant

|- style="height:2em"
| rowspan=3 | Appointed to finish Sevier's term.
| rowspan=6 nowrap | Mar 30, 1848 –Apr 11, 1853
| rowspan=6  | Democratic
| rowspan=6 align=right | Solon Borland
! rowspan=6 | 2

|- style="height:2em"
| colspan=3 | Vacant
| nowrap | Apr 29, 1848 –May 12, 1848
|  

|- style="height:2em"
! rowspan=10 | 3
| rowspan=10 align=left | William K. Sebastian
| rowspan=10  | Democratic
| rowspan=10 nowrap | May 12, 1848 –Jul 11, 1861
| rowspan=3 | Appointed to continue Ashley's term.Elected in 1848 to finish Ashley's term.

|- style="height:2em"
| 
| rowspan=5 | 4
| rowspan=3 | Elected to full term in 1848.Resigned.

|- style="height:2em"
| 

|- style="height:2em"
| rowspan=5 | Elected to full term in 1853.
| rowspan=5 | 4
| rowspan=3 

|- style="height:2em"
|  
| nowrap | Apr 11, 1853 –Jul 6, 1853
| colspan=3 | Vacant

|- style="height:2em"
| Appointed to continue Borland's term.Elected in 1854 to finish Borland's term.
| rowspan=4 nowrap | Jul 6, 1853 –Mar 3, 1861
| rowspan=4  | Democratic
| rowspan=4 align=right | Robert Ward Johnson
! rowspan=4 | 3

|- style="height:2em"
| 
| rowspan=3 | 5
| rowspan=3 | Re-elected in 1855.Retired.

|- style="height:2em"
| 

|- style="height:2em"
| rowspan=2 | Re-elected in 1859.Expelled.(Expulsion was reversed by the Senate in 1877).
| rowspan=4 | 5
| 

|- style="height:2em"
| rowspan=2 
| rowspan=4 | 6
| Elected in 1860 or 1861.Expelled for supporting the Confederacy.
| nowrap | Mar 4, 1861 –Jul 11, 1861
|  | Democratic
| align=right | Charles B. Mitchel
! 4

|- style="height:2em"
| rowspan=4 colspan=3 | Vacant
| rowspan=4 nowrap | Jul 11, 1861 –Jun 22, 1868
| rowspan=4 | Civil War and Reconstruction
| rowspan=5 | Civil War and Reconstruction
| rowspan=5 nowrap | Jul 11, 1861 –Jun 23, 1868
| rowspan=5 colspan=3 | Vacant

|- style="height:2em"
| 

|- style="height:2em"
| rowspan=5 | 6
| 

|- style="height:2em"
| rowspan=3 
| rowspan=5 | 7

|- style="height:2em"
! rowspan=3 | 4
| rowspan=3 align=left | Alexander McDonald
| rowspan=3  | Republican
| rowspan=3 nowrap | Jun 22, 1868 –Mar 3, 1871
| rowspan=3 | Elected upon readmission.Lost re-election.

|- style="height:2em"
| rowspan=3 | Elected upon readmission.Unknown if retired or lost re-election.
| rowspan=3 nowrap | Jun 23, 1868 –Mar 3, 1873
| rowspan=3  | Republican
| rowspan=3 align=right | Benjamin F. Rice
! rowspan=3 | 5

|- style="height:2em"
| 

|- style="height:2em"
! rowspan=3 | 5
| rowspan=3 align=left | Powell Clayton
| rowspan=3  | Republican
| rowspan=3 nowrap | Mar 4, 1871 –Mar 3, 1877
| rowspan=3 | Elected in 1870.Unknown if retired or lost re-election.
| rowspan=3 | 7
| 

|- style="height:2em"
| 
| rowspan=3 | 8
| rowspan=3 | Elected in 1872 or 1873.Retired.
| rowspan=3 nowrap | Mar 4, 1873 –Mar 3, 1879
| rowspan=3  | Republican
| rowspan=3 align=right | Stephen Wallace Dorsey
! rowspan=3 | 6

|- style="height:2em"
| 

|- style="height:2em"
! rowspan=5 | 6
| rowspan=5 align=left | Augustus Hill Garland
| rowspan=5  | Democratic
| rowspan=5 nowrap | Mar 4, 1877 –Mar 6, 1885
| rowspan=3 | Elected in 1876.
| rowspan=3 | 8
| 

|- style="height:2em"
| 
| rowspan=3 | 9
| rowspan=3 | Elected in 1878.Retired.
| rowspan=3 nowrap | Mar 4, 1879 –Mar 3, 1885
| rowspan=3  | Democratic
| rowspan=3 align=right | James D. Walker
! rowspan=3 | 7

|- style="height:2em"
| 

|- style="height:2em"
| rowspan=2 | Re-elected in 1883.Resigned to become U.S. Attorney General.
| rowspan=5 | 9
| 

|- style="height:2em"
| rowspan=3 
| rowspan=5 | 10
| rowspan=5 | Elected in 1885.
| rowspan=11 nowrap | Mar 4, 1885 –Mar 3, 1903
| rowspan=11  | Democratic
| rowspan=11 align=right | James Kimbrough Jones
! rowspan=11 | 8

|- style="height:2em"
| colspan=3 | Vacant
| nowrap | Mar 6, 1885 –Mar 20, 1885
|  

|- style="height:2em"
! rowspan=11 | 7
| rowspan=11 align=left | James Henderson Berry
| rowspan=11  | Democratic
| rowspan=11 nowrap | Mar 20, 1885 –Mar 3, 1907
| rowspan=2 | Elected to finish Garland's term.

|- style="height:2em"
| 

|- style="height:2em"
| rowspan=3 | Re-elected in 1889.
| rowspan=3 | 10
| 

|- style="height:2em"
| 
| rowspan=3 | 11
| rowspan=3 | Re-elected in 1891.

|- style="height:2em"
| 

|- style="height:2em"
| rowspan=3 | Re-elected in 1895.
| rowspan=3 | 11
| 

|- style="height:2em"
| 
| rowspan=3 | 12
| rowspan=3 | Re-elected in 1897.Lost re-election.

|- style="height:2em"
| 

|- style="height:2em"
| rowspan=3 | Re-elected in 1901.Lost re-election.
| rowspan=3 | 12
| 

|- style="height:2em"
| 
| rowspan=3 | 13
| rowspan=3 | Elected in 1903.
| rowspan=10 nowrap | Mar 4, 1903 –Oct 1, 1916
| rowspan=10  | Democratic
| rowspan=10 align=right | James Paul Clarke
! rowspan=10 | 9

|- style="height:2em"
| 

|- style="height:2em"
! rowspan=3 | 8
| rowspan=3 align=left | Jeff Davis
| rowspan=3  | Democratic
| rowspan=3 nowrap | Mar 4, 1907 –Jan 3, 1913
| rowspan=3 | Elected in 1907.Died.
| rowspan=6 | 13
| 

|- style="height:2em"
| 
| rowspan=6 | 14
| rowspan=6 | Re-elected in 1909.

|- style="height:2em"
| rowspan=4 

|- style="height:2em"
| colspan=3 | Vacant
| nowrap | Jan 3, 1913 –Jan 6, 1913
|  

|- style="height:2em"
! 9
| align=left | John N. Heiskell
|  | Democratic
| nowrap | Jan 6, 1913 –Jan 29, 1913
| Appointed to continue Davis's term.Successor qualified.

|- style="height:2em"
! 10
| align=left | William M. Kavanaugh
|  | Democratic
| nowrap | Jan 29, 1913 –Mar 3, 1913
| Elected to finish Davis's term.Retired.

|- style="height:2em"
! rowspan=17 | 11
| rowspan=17 align=left | Joseph Taylor Robinson
| rowspan=17  | Democratic
| rowspan=17 nowrap | Mar 4, 1913 –Jul 14, 1937
| rowspan=5 | Elected in 1913.
| rowspan=5 | 14
| 

|- style="height:2em"
| rowspan=3 
| rowspan=5 | 15
| Re-elected in 1914.Died.

|- style="height:2em"
|  
| nowrap | Oct 1, 1916 –Nov 8, 1916
| colspan=3 | Vacant

|- style="height:2em"
| rowspan=3 | Elected to finish Clarke's term.Lost renomination.
| rowspan=3 nowrap | Nov 8, 1916 –Mar 3, 1921
| rowspan=3  | Democratic
| rowspan=3 align=right | William F. Kirby
! rowspan=3 | 10

|- style="height:2em"
| 

|- style="height:2em"
| rowspan=3 | Re-elected in 1918.
| rowspan=3 | 15
| 

|- style="height:2em"
| 
| rowspan=3 | 16
| rowspan=3 | Elected in 1920.
| rowspan=6 nowrap | Mar 4, 1921 –Nov 6, 1931
| rowspan=6  | Democratic
| rowspan=6 align=right | Thaddeus H. Caraway
! rowspan=6 | 11

|- style="height:2em"
| 

|- style="height:2em"
| rowspan=3 | Re-elected in 1924.
| rowspan=3 | 16
| 

|- style="height:2em"
| 
| rowspan=5 | 17
| rowspan=3 | Re-elected in 1926.Died.

|- style="height:2em"
| 

|- style="height:2em"
| rowspan=5 | Re-elected in 1930.
| rowspan=5 | 17
| rowspan=3 

|- style="height:2em"
|  
| nowrap | Nov 6, 1931 –Nov 13, 1931
| colspan=3 | Vacant

|- style="height:2em"
| Appointed to finish her husband's term.Elected in 1932 to finish her husband's term.
| rowspan=11 nowrap | Nov 13, 1931 –Jan 3, 1945
| rowspan=11  | Democratic
| rowspan=11 align=right | Hattie Wyatt Caraway
! rowspan=11 | 12

|- style="height:2em"
| 
| rowspan=5 | 18
| rowspan=5 | Re-elected in 1932.

|- style="height:2em"
| 

|- style="height:2em"
| Re-elected in 1936.Died.
| rowspan=7 | 18
| rowspan=3 

|- style="height:2em"
| colspan=3 | Vacant
| nowrap | Jul 14, 1937 –Nov 15, 1937
|  

|- style="height:2em"
! rowspan=3 | 12
| rowspan=3 align=left | John E. Miller
| rowspan=3  | Democratic
| rowspan=3 nowrap | Nov 15, 1937 –Mar 31, 1941
| rowspan=3 | Elected to finish Robinson's term.Resigned to become U.S. District Judge.

|- style="height:2em"
| 
| rowspan=5 | 19
| rowspan=5 | Re-elected in 1938.Lost renomination.

|- style="height:2em"
| rowspan=3 

|- style="height:2em"
| colspan=3 | Vacant
| nowrap | Mar 31, 1941 –Apr 1, 1941
|  

|- style="height:2em"
! 13
| align=left | Lloyd Spencer
|  | Democratic
| nowrap | Apr 1, 1941 –Jan 3, 1943
| Appointed to finish Miller's term.Retired.

|- style="height:2em"
! rowspan=19 | 14
| rowspan=19 align=left | John L. McClellan
| rowspan=19  | Democratic
| rowspan=19 nowrap | Jan 3, 1943 –Nov 28, 1977
| rowspan=3 | Elected in 1942.
| rowspan=3 | 19
| 

|- style="height:2em"
| 
| rowspan=3 | 20
| rowspan=3 | Elected in 1944.
| rowspan=15 nowrap | Jan 3, 1945 – Dec 31, 1974
| rowspan=15  | Democratic
| rowspan=15 align=right | J. William Fulbright
! rowspan=15 | 13

|- style="height:2em"
| 

|- style="height:2em"
| rowspan=3 | Re-elected in 1948.
| rowspan=3 | 20
| 

|- style="height:2em"
| 
| rowspan=3 | 21
| rowspan=3 | Re-elected in 1950.

|- style="height:2em"
| 

|- style="height:2em"
| rowspan=3 | Re-elected in 1954.
| rowspan=3 | 21
| 

|- style="height:2em"
| 
| rowspan=3 | 22
| rowspan=3 | Re-elected in 1956.

|- style="height:2em"
| 

|- style="height:2em"
| rowspan=3 | Re-elected in 1960.
| rowspan=3 | 22
| 

|- style="height:2em"
| 
| rowspan=3 | 23
| rowspan=3 | Re-elected in 1962.

|- style="height:2em"
| 

|- style="height:2em"
| rowspan=3 | Re-elected in 1966.
| rowspan=3 | 23
| 

|- style="height:2em"
| 
| rowspan=4 | 24
| rowspan=3 | Re-elected in 1968.Lost re-nomination, then resigned.

|- style="height:2em"
| 

|- style="height:2em"
| rowspan=4 | Re-elected in 1972.Died.
| rowspan=6 | 24
| rowspan=2 

|- style="height:2em"
|  
| nowrap | Dec 31, 1974 –Jan 3, 1975
| colspan=3 | Vacant

|- style="height:2em"
| 
| rowspan=5 | 25
| rowspan=5 | Elected in 1974.
| rowspan=14 nowrap | Jan 3, 1975 –Jan 3, 1999
| rowspan=14  | Democratic
| rowspan=14 align=right | Dale Bumpers
! rowspan=14 | 14

|- style="height:2em"
| rowspan=3 

|- style="height:2em"
| colspan=3 | Vacant
| nowrap | Nov 28, 1977 –Dec 10, 1977
|  

|- style="height:2em"
! 15
| align=left | Kaneaster Hodges Jr.
|  | Democratic
| nowrap | Dec 10, 1977 –Jan 3, 1979
| Appointed to finish McClellan's term.Retired.

|- style="height:2em"
! rowspan=9 | 16
| rowspan=9 align=left | David Pryor
| rowspan=9  | Democratic
| rowspan=9 nowrap | Jan 3, 1979 –Jan 3, 1997
| rowspan=3 | Elected in 1978.
| rowspan=3 | 25
| 

|- style="height:2em"
| 
| rowspan=3 | 26
| rowspan=3 | Re-elected in 1980.

|- style="height:2em"
| 

|- style="height:2em"
| rowspan=3 | Re-elected in 1984.
| rowspan=3 | 26
| 

|- style="height:2em"
| 
| rowspan=3 | 27
| rowspan=3 | Re-elected in 1986.

|- style="height:2em"
| 

|- style="height:2em"
| rowspan=3 | Re-elected in 1990.Retired.
| rowspan=3 | 27
| 

|- style="height:2em"
| 
| rowspan=3 | 28
| rowspan=3 | Re-elected in 1992.Retired.

|- style="height:2em"
| 

|- style="height:2em"
! rowspan=3 | 17
| rowspan=3 align=left | Tim Hutchinson
| rowspan=3  | Republican
| rowspan=3 nowrap | Jan 3, 1997 –Jan 3, 2003
| rowspan=3 | Elected in 1996.Lost re-election.
| rowspan=3 | 28
| 

|- style="height:2em"
| 
| rowspan=3 | 29
| rowspan=3 | Elected in 1998.
| rowspan=6 nowrap | Jan 3, 1999 –Jan 3, 2011
| rowspan=6  | Democratic
| rowspan=6 align=right | Blanche Lincoln
! rowspan=6 | 15

|- style="height:2em"
| 

|- style="height:2em"
! rowspan=6 | 18
| rowspan=6 align=left | Mark Pryor
| rowspan=6  | Democratic
| rowspan=6 | Jan 3, 2003 –Jan 3, 2015
| rowspan=3 | Elected in 2002.
| rowspan=3 | 29
| 

|- style="height:2em"
| 
| rowspan=3 | 30
| rowspan=3 | Re-elected in 2004.Lost re-election.

|- style="height:2em"
| 

|- style="height:2em"
| rowspan=3 | Re-elected in 2008.Lost re-election.
| rowspan=3 | 30
| 

|- style="height:2em"
| 
| rowspan=3 | 31
| rowspan=3 | Elected in 2010.
| rowspan=9 | Jan 3, 2011 –Present
| rowspan=9  | Republican
| rowspan=9 align=right | John Boozman
! rowspan=9 | 16

|- style="height:2em"
| 

|- style="height:2em"
! rowspan=6 | 19
| rowspan=6 align=left | Tom Cotton
| rowspan=6  | Republican
| rowspan=6 nowrap | Jan 3, 2015 –Present
| rowspan=3 | Elected in 2014.
| rowspan=3 | 31
| 

|- style="height:2em"
| 
| rowspan=3 | 32
| rowspan=3 | Re-elected in 2016.

|- style="height:2em"
| 

|- style="height:2em"
| rowspan=3 | Re-elected in 2020.
| rowspan=3 | 32
| 

|- style="height:2em"
| 
| rowspan=3 |33
| rowspan=3 | Re-elected in 2022.

|- style="height:2em"
| 

|- style="height:2em"
| rowspan=2 colspan=5 | To be determined in the 2026 election.
| rowspan=2 | 33
| 

|- style="height:2em"
| 
| 34
| colspan=5 | To be determined in the 2028 election.

See also

 List of United States representatives from Arkansas
 United States congressional delegations from Arkansas
 Elections in Arkansas

Notes

References

 
United States senators
Arkansas